Vijay Raghavendra is an Indian actor who appears predominantly in Kannada films. Referred to popularly as "Chinnari Mutha", Vijay is the son of producer S. A. Chinne Gowda and nephew of actor Dr.Rajkumar.

Vijay started his career as a child artist through the film Chalisuva Modagalu (1982) and won critical acclaims for his performances in Chinnari Mutha (1993) and Kotreshi Kanasu (1994). The latter film won him the National Film Award for Best Child Artist. His first Hero lead role was in Ramoji Rao's production titled Ninagagi in 2002, which was a commercial success and one of the highest-grossing films of the year. However, his subsequent projects under-performed at the box office until he was noticed for his role in the T. S. Nagabharana's period drama Kallarali Hoovagi in 2006, followed by his home production film Sevanthi Sevanthi in the same year. For playing the role of Puttaraj Gawai in the biographical film Shivayogi Sri Puttayyajja in 2016, Vijay won the Karnataka State Film Award for Best Actor. In 2018, he made his directorial debut in Kismath (2018).

In 2013, by public vote, Vijay won the first season of the game show Bigg Boss – the Indian version of Celebrity Big Brother, currently produced by Endemol India.

Early life
Vijay Raghavendra was born in Bangalore, India to a family of film personalities. He began to act in films featuring his uncle Rajkumar in the lead. After having acted in about eight films as a bad artist, Vijay underwent a formal training in acting at Chennai.

Film career

Child roles : 1980s - 1990s
In 1982, Vijay appeared in a small role as a child in Singeetham Srinivasa Rao's romantic drama Chalisuva Modagalu, starring his uncle Rajkumar, Ambika and his cousin Puneeth Rajkumar, credited as Master Lohith. He went on to appear in the 1989 movie Parashuram, alongside his cousin Puneeth Rajkumar in a song. After a brief gap, in 1991 he appeared in Aralida Hoovugalu, a remake of the Hindi film Jawani Diwani (1971), directed by Chi. Dattaraj and co-starred Shiva Rajkumar.  His next movie Chinnari Mutha became a huge success and he became a household name in Karnataka. After that, he acted in many movies, including Kotreshi Kanasu, for which he won a National Award for his performance.

In 1993, Vijay, in his teens, appeared in three films: H. R. Bhargava's novel-based drama Jaga Mechida Huduga, Renuka Sharma's devotional Kollura Sri Mookambika, where he played the role of young Shankaracharya and the lead protagonist in the T. S. Nagabharana's Children's film Chinnari Mutha. The film won multiple laurels and awards upon release both at the state and national level. Vijay won the Karnataka State Film Award for Best Child Actor (Male) for his portrayal of an innocent Mutha who rises to great popularity through his good deeds. His popularity further rose in 1995 with the Nagathihalli Chandrashekar's film adaption of the novel "Kotra Highschoolige Seriddu", titled Kotreshi Kanasu. Vijay played the titular role of Kotreshi and went on to win the National Film Award for Best Child Artist for the year 1994–95. The other film he featured in was the biographical Sangeetha Sagara Ganayogi Panchakshara Gavai, directed by Chindodi Bangaresh. He again played the titular role as the young and blind reformer Gawai and also portrayed the younger part of Narendra in the Hindi film Swami Vivekananda. Following this, he took a break from films and concentrated on his studies.

Adult roles: 2002 - Present
His first adult role as an actor was in Ninagagi (2002), a box office blockbuster which brought him success on his first role opposite the debutant Radhika. The film was a remake of the Telugu hit Nuvve Kavali, which screened for over 100 days and created a record. Following this success, he signed two more movies in the same year, which could not succeed at the box office. He has acted in many movies since then. His notable movies are Kallarali Hoovagi, Rishi, Khushi and Kaaranji.

Vijay did not have a single release in 2010. His much delayed films Shraavana, Vinayaka Geleyara Balaga and the multi-starrer Kalla Malla Sulla released in 2011 with the latter two films earning favourable reviews. In 2012, he starred again in a multi-starrer comedy Snehitaru, which received a mixed response at the box office. In 2015, he starred in the biographical Shivayogi Sri Puttayyajja and won the Karnataka State Film Award for Best Actor.

In 2013, Vijay was a contestant and winner in the much talked about Kannada version of the reality show Bigg Boss in its first season, which started with 13 contestants. Vijay has been reportedly paid Rs. 5 million prize money.

Personal life
Vijay is the eldest child of producer S. A. Chinne Gowda and his wife Jayamma. His younger brother Sriimurali is a popular Kannada film actor. His paternal aunt Parvathamma Rajkumar was a prominent film producer and distributor in Kannada cinema. He is the cousin of actors Shiva Rajkumar, Raghavendra Rajkumar and Puneeth Rajkumar. On 26 August 2007, he married a Tulu girl Spandana, the daughter of Assistant Commissioner of Police, B. K. Shivaram. The couple has a son named Shourya.

Charitable work

In 2013, it was announced that he had joined other Bollywood and international celebrities in the TeachAids initiative, a state-of-the-art approach to worldwide HIV prevention, developed at Stanford University.

Filmography

Actor

Singer

Television

References

External links

 

Living people
Kannada people
Male actors in Kannada cinema
Indian male film actors
Male actors from Bangalore
20th-century Indian male actors
21st-century Indian male actors
Participants in Indian reality television series
Reality show winners
Big Brother (franchise) winners
Kannada playback singers
Indian male playback singers
Indian male child actors
Best Child Artist National Film Award winners
Year of birth missing (living people)
Bigg Boss Kannada contestants